Alan Leishman is an Australian garden administrator and amateur ornithologist.  He works for the Royal Botanic Gardens, Sydney.  He is a bird-bander and has had a long association with the Australian Bird Study Association, serving as foundation editor of its journal Corella 1977–1983, and production editor 1984–1989.  In 1998 he was awarded the RAOU's John Hobbs Medal for outstanding contributions to Australian ornithology as an amateur.

See also
List of ornithologists

References
Robin, Libby. (2001). The Flight of the Emu: a hundred years of Australian ornithology 1901–2001. Carlton, Vic. Melbourne University Press. 

Australian ornithologists
Year of birth missing (living people)
Living people